Carl Gabriel Adelsköld (6 October 1830 – 4 November 1914) was a Swedish painter.

Carl Gabriel Adelsköld studied at Stockholm and abroad. He was a painter of landscape and navy and painted often coast motives.

References

1830 births
1914 deaths
Swedish male painters
19th-century Swedish male artists
19th-century Swedish painters
20th-century Swedish painters
20th-century Swedish male artists